Televisioon was a newspaper published in Estonia.

References

Newspapers published in Estonia
Mass media in Tallinn